Marinococcus salis is a Gram-positive, halophilic, coccoid-shaped, facultative anaerobic and motile bacterium from the genus of Marinococcus which has been isolated from salt marsh from Surajbari in India.

References

 

Bacillaceae
Bacteria described in 2017